Joan Roca i Fontané (born 11 February 1964) is a Spanish chef, best known as founder and head chef of El Celler de Can Roca, awarded three Michelin stars in 2009. In 2013 & 2015, it was named the best restaurant in the world by the Restaurant Magazine. It was ranked second by the same magazine in 2011, 2012 & 2014.

He studied in Escola d'Hosteleria de Girona, where later he became a teacher. He worked with his grandparents and parents in their family business, a restaurant of traditional Catalan cuisine. Today Joan is the chef of his own restaurant, together with his two brothers, Josep (sommelier), and Jordi (pastry chef). He is elaborating traditional cuisine together with avant-garde techniques, which implies research of both modern techniques and traditional recipes.
Some of the techniques he uses are Sous-vide, "Perfume-cooking" and Distillation.

Acknowledgments 
 2000. Cook of the year by the Spanish Academy of Gastronomy.
 2002. Second Michelin Star for El Celler de Can Roca.
 2009. Third Michelin Star for El Celler de Can Roca. and 5th position in the Restaurant Magazine
 2010. Honorary degree by the University of Girona
 2011. Appears in the list of the "20 most influential cooks of the world".
 2011. Second best restaurant in the world for El Celler de Can Roca, by the Restaurant Magazine.
 2012. Second best restaurant in the world for El Celler de Can Roca, by the Restaurant Magazine.
 2013. Best restaurant in the world for El Celler de Can Roca, by the Restaurant Magazine.
 2015. Best restaurant in the world for El Celler de Can Roca, by the Restaurant Magazine.
 2016. Chefs’ Choice Award by Restaurant Magazine 
 2017 The Best Chef by The Best Chef Awards
 2018 The Best Chef by The Best Chef Awards

Publications 
El Celler de Can Roca, by Joan, Josep and Jordi Roca. In Catalan, Spanish and English.
La cocina al vacío (Sous-Vide Cuisine), by Joan Roca and Salvador Brugués. Translated to English, French, German and Italian.
Les receptes catalanes de tota la vida (Lifelong catalan recipes), by Joan Roca and his mother, Montserrat Fontané.
La cuina de la meva mare (The cooking of my mother), by Joan Roca. In Catalan and Spanish.
Deu menus per a un concert (Ten menus for a concert), by Joan Roca. In Catalan and Spanish.

See also 
 Haute cuisine

References

External links 

El Celler de Can Roca
Entrevista de Ramon Texidó a Diari Maresme (12/02/2010)

Chefs from Catalonia
Living people
1964 births
Head chefs of Michelin starred restaurants
Food writers from Catalonia
Spanish chefs